The 1997 FIRA Women's European Championship was the third edition of the championship, it saw a significant expansion to eight teams, with three British entrants entering a FIRA event for the first time - and an all British final.

Bracket

First round

Plate semi-finals

Semi-finals

7th/8th Place

Plate final

3rd/4th Place

Final

See also
Women's international rugby union

References

External links
FIRA website

1997
1997 rugby union tournaments for national teams
International women's rugby union competitions hosted by France
1996–97 in European women's rugby union
1996–97 in French rugby union
1996–97 in Italian rugby union
1996–97 in English rugby union
1996–97 in Irish rugby union
1996–97 in Scottish rugby union
1997 in Dutch women's sport
1997 in Spanish women's sport
1997 in English women's sport
1997 in German women's sport
rugby union
rugby union
rugby union